Aeronutronic was a defense related division of Ford Aerospace, owned by Ford Motor Company, and based in  Newport Beach, Orange County, California. 

The  Engineering and Research Center campus was located on Jamboree Road at Ford Road, overlooking Balboa Bay and the Santa Catalina Strait of the Pacific Ocean in Newport Beach.  The facility's  master plan and main buildings were designed by Modernist architect William Pereira in 1958.

History
The company was established in 1956 as Aeronutronic Systems, Inc.

The company provided major support for the development of Project Space Track (1957-1961).

Philco Aeronutronic
In 1961 Ford purchased Philco and merged the two companies into Philco Aeronutronic in 1963.  It became NASA's primary communications equipment vendor during the 1960s, also building the consoles in the Manned Spacecraft Center in Houston.

Its Space Systems division in Palo Alto built satellites, ground stations, and sophisticated tracking and control systems for the military. In 1988 the unit received a contract to build the next generation of Intelsat communications satellites.

In 1978, Ford received its first contract for a prototype of an Army air defense gun system, the Sergeant York Gun. After persistent technical problems and some $1.3 billion in development costs,  in 1985 Defense Secretary Caspar W. Weinberger canceled the program. Around 1,300 Aeronutronic workers were laid off as a result.

Many portions of the Philco side of the company were sold off in the early 1970s. By 1975 all that was left was the original Aeronutronic divisions. These were renamed Ford Aerospace and Communications Corporation in December 1976, and then Ford Aerospace Corporation in January 1988.

Space Systems/Loral
In October 1990 Ford Aerospace and Aeronutronic defense plant were sold by Ford Motor Company to Loral to become Space Systems/Loral.

In 1996 the Loral Space & Communications defense electronics and system integration businesses were acquired by Lockheed Martin.

The Newport Beach plant was demolished, and rezoned for residential development.

Products
AGM-88 HARM (subcontractor)
AIM-9 Sidewinder
AN/AAS-38 (F/A-18 FLIR)
Have Dash
LGM-118 Peacekeeper (subcontractor)
LGM-30 Minuteman (subcontractor)
MGM-51 Shillelagh
MIM-72 Chaparral
Pave Knife
Pave Tack
UGM-73 Poseidon (subcontractor)
Trident (missile) (subcontractor)

References

External links
University of California Irvine Library, Online Archives: "Aerial view of Ford Aeronutronics Plant in 1960"
 Flickr.com: "Aerial view  of Ford Ford Aerospace & Communications & Newport Beach c.1983 

Ford Motor Company
Aerospace companies of the United States
Defense companies of the United States
Technology companies based in Greater Los Angeles
Companies based in Newport Beach, California
Loral Space & Communications
Manufacturing companies established in 1956
Technology companies established in 1956
Manufacturing companies disestablished in 1990
Technology companies disestablished in 1990
1956 establishments in California
1990 disestablishments in California
Defunct companies based in Greater Los Angeles
Buildings and structures in Newport Beach, California
Buildings and structures completed in 1958
Demolished buildings and structures in California
William Pereira buildings
Defunct manufacturing companies based in California